Thomas Holland (died ca. 1618) was an English merchant and politician who sat in the House of Commons at various times between 1593 and 1611.

Holland was the son of a freeman of Dartmouth and his wife Anne Holland of Wood Street London. In 1592 he played a major part in the purchase of a Spanish carrack, the Madre de Dios, which had been brought into Dartmouth Harbour. He was elected Member of Parliament for Dartmouth in 1593. He was Mayor of Dartmouth in 1597. Over the years, he leased land and property from the town of Dartmouth and lent large sums of money to the corporation.  In 1604 and 1614 he was elected MP for Dartmouth again.

Holland made his will in November 1618 and died by 9 March 1619 when the will was proved.

Holland was married and had at least one son and daughter.

References

Year of birth missing
1618 deaths
16th-century merchants
17th-century merchants
Members of the Parliament of England for Dartmouth
English MPs 1593
English MPs 1604–1611
English MPs 1614
Mayors of Dartmouth, Devon